Kyle Shelford (born 13 September 1996) is an English professional rugby league footballer who plays as a  and  for the Warrington Wolves in the Super League.

He previously played for the Swinton Lions in the Betfred Championship.

Background
Shelford was born in Wigan, Greater Manchester, England.

He is the son of former late New Zealand international Adrian Shelford.

Career

Wigan Warriors
In 2016 Shelford played once for Wigan and once for Swinton on dual registration. In 2017, Shelford joined Workington Town on a season-long loan deal. In October 2017 he signed for Swinton.

Swinton Lions
Shelford played part-time for Swinton after leaving Wigan

Rochdale Hornets
On 21 Jun 2019 it was reported that he had signed for Rochdale Hornets in the RFL League 1

Warrington Wolves
On 26 Jan 2020 it was reported that he had signed for Warrington Wolves in the Super League on a part-time contract

In Sep 2020 Shelford made his Super League debut for the Warrington Wolves vs Salford Red Devils.

References

External links
Warrington Wolves profile
Swinton Lions profile
 Wigan Warriors profile

1996 births
Living people
Rochdale Hornets players
Rugby league locks
Rugby league players from Wigan
Swinton Lions players
Warrington Wolves players
Wigan Warriors players
Workington Town players